There are over 9,000 Grade I listed buildings in England. This page is a list of these buildings in the district of South Oxfordshire in Oxfordshire.

List of buildings

|}

See also
 Grade I listed buildings in Oxfordshire
 Grade I listed buildings in Cherwell (district)
 Grade I listed buildings in Oxford
 Grade I listed buildings in Vale of White Horse
 Grade I listed buildings in West Oxfordshire
 Grade II* listed buildings in South Oxfordshire

Notes

External links

Grade I listed buildings in Oxfordshire
Lists of Grade I listed buildings in Oxfordshire
South Oxfordshire District